Ezra Stiles Gannett (May 4, 1801–August 26, 1871) was a Unitarian minister in Boston, Massachusetts.

The grandson of Yale University president Ezra Stiles, he was graduated from Harvard College, and in 1824 he began working for the Federal Street Church; he remained with the congregation for the duration of his career. In 1861 he moved with his congregation to a new building, the Arlington Street Church in Back Bay. He was also associated with the American Unitarian Association. "He was a Unitarian of the more conservative type, an excellent preacher, and an ardent reformer." Reverend Gannett was killed in a train wreck a few miles north of Boston, Massachusetts on August 26, 1871. Gannett is buried in Mount Auburn Cemetery. He was the great-grandfather of author Ruth Stiles Gannett and the father of writer and social reformer Kate Gannett Wells.

References

Further reading

Works by Gannett
 Relation of the North to slavery: A discourse preached in the Federal Street Church. 1854.
 A discourse delivered in the meetinghouse on Church Green: Boston, on Monday, March 20, 1854, at the funeral of the late Rev. Alexander Young, D.D., pastor of the New South Church. Boston: Crosby, Nichols, and Co., 1854.
 National Commercial Convention: a discourse delivered in the Arlington-street Meeting-house, in Boston, on Sunday, Feb. 16, 1868.

Works about Gannett
 Ezra Stiles Gannett, D.D. New York Times, August 28, 1871; p. 4.
 Calvin Lincoln. A discourse on the life and character of Rev. Ezra Stiles Gannett, D.D., delivered in the meeting-house of the first parish in Hingham. 1871.
 James Freeman Clarke. Memorial and biographical sketches. 1878.
 William Channing Gannett. Ezra Stiles Gannett, Unitarian minister in Boston, 1824-1871: a memoir. Boston: Roberts Bros., 1875. 3rd ed., American Unitarian Association, 1893.
 Samuel Atkins Eliot. Heralds of a liberal faith, Volume 3. 1910.
 Stuart Twite. Ezra Stiles Gannett. Unitarian Universalist Historical Society. Retrieved 12 January 2010.

External links
 The papers and sermons of Ezra Stiles Gannett are in the Harvard Divinity School Library at Harvard Divinity School in Cambridge, Massachusetts.
 
 

1801 births
1871 deaths
19th-century Unitarian clergy
Clergy from Boston
Harvard College alumni
19th-century American clergy